Sagleipie (also, Sacleipea, Sacleipie, Sakalapie, Saklape, Sakripie, and Sakriple) is one of the largest cities in Liberia and the second largest city in Nimba County, with a population of over 12,000.

References

Nimba County
Populated places in Liberia